The 2017–18 LEN Champions League was the 55th edition of LEN's premier competition for men's water polo clubs.

Overview

Team allocation
12 teams are directly qualified for the preliminary round (TH: Champions League title holders).

Phases and rounds dates
The schedule of the competition is as follows.

Qualifying rounds

Qualification round I

Group A

Group B

Group C

Qualification round II

Group E

Group F

Group G

Group H

Qualification round III

|}

Preliminary round

The draw for the group stage was held on 29 August 2017 in Budapest. The 16 teams were drawn into two groups of eight.

In each group, teams play against each other home-and-away in a round-robin format. The group winners, runners-ups, third and fourth placed teams advance to the Final 8. The matchdays are 25 October, 8 and 29 November, 9 and 20 December 2017, 13 and 24 January, 7 and 28 February, 14 and 31 March, 18 and 28 April, 9 May 2018.

A total of 11 national associations are represented in the group stage.

Group A

Group B

Final Eight

7–9 June 2018—Genoa, Italy

Final standings

Awards

See also
2017–18 LEN Euro Cup

References

External links

 
LEN Champions League seasons
Champions League
2017 in water polo
2018 in water polo